Macrophage inducible Ca2+-dependent lectin receptor, (abbreviated to Mincle), is a member of the C-type lectin superfamily encoded by the gene CLEC4E. It is a pattern recognition receptor that can recognize glycolipids including mycobacterial cord factor, trehalose-6,6'-dimycolate (TDM). The mincle receptor binds a range of carbohydrate structures, predominantly containing glucose or mannose, and play an important role in recognition of bacterial glycolipids by the immune system. Upon activation by cord factor, Mincle binds the Fc receptor FcRγ and Syk. Cord factor also binds and activates the related C-type lectin MCL. Upon receptor stimulation is PKC-δ activated, which subsequently phosphorylates CARD9 that triggers recruitment of BCL10 and MALT1, leading to a CARD-CC/BCL10/MALT1 (CBM) signaling complex.  This signaling complex in turn triggers downstream recruitment of TRAF6 and NF-κB activation.

A wide range of ligands promote signalling through Mincle, including proteins, sterols and glycolipids from altered or damaged self, and various glycolipids from pathogenic and commensal organisms.

Mincle agonists from self
Crystalline cholesterol, which accumulates in atherosclerotic lesions, can signal through human Mincle. Cholesterol sulfate, which is present in the skin, is a cause of sterile inflammation through agonizing Mincle signalling. The protein SAP130 signal through Mincle. Beta-glucosylceramide, which accumulates as a result of the lysosomal storage disorder Gaucher’s disease, signals through Mincle.

Mincle agonists from microbes
Mycobacteria and corynebacteria produce a wide range of glycolipids that can signal through Mincle. These include glucose and trehalose mycolates, and their closely related corynomycolates from mycobacteria and corynebacteria. Glycosyl diglycerides from various pathogenic and commensal bacteria and fungi such as Lactobacillus plantarum, Streptococcus pneumoniae, Mycobacterium tuberculosis and Malassezia sp.

See also
Pattern recognition receptors
C-type lectin

References